Digital dentistry refers to the use of dental technologies or devices that incorporates digital or computer-controlled components to carry out dental procedures rather than using mechanical or electrical tools. The use of digital dentistry can make carrying out dental procedures more efficient than using mechanical tools, both for restorative as diagnostic purposes. Used as a way to facilitate dental treatments and propose new ways to meet rising patient demands.

The 'father' of digital dentistry is the French professor François Duret, who invented dental CAD/CAM in 1971.

Digital dentistry technologies 
Some of the technologies used in digital dentistry include:
Intraoral cameras
Intraoral Scanners (IOS)
CAD/CAM
Computer-aided implant dentistry — including design and fabrication of surgical guides
Computer-aided crown manufacturing
3D Printing (e.g. to print physical models of digital images taken with intra-oral scans, make appliances, temporaries, surgical guides)
Digital radiography 
Cone beam computed tomography (CBCT)
Magnetic resonance imaging
CT scans
Electric and surgical/implant handpieces
Computer-aided implant dentistry
Photography (extraoral and intraoral)
Practice and patient record management software — including digital patient education e.g. Thalamus Patient Education
Shade matching
Diagnodent
DEXIS CariVu
Dental lasers
The Wand — used to carry anesthesia
Digital X-rays (includes both direct sensors and indirect phosphor plate systems)
Dental loupes
Virtual and augmented reality

Intra-oral cameras 
X-rays have been extremely valuable for many years in assessments of oral health. However, at times the image produced can show limited information because it is only a 2D image. Intra-oral cameras (IOCs) allow an operator to see a clear image of the inside of the mouth. Similar to the size of a dental mirror IOCs have a tiny camera that is able to detect more on the 3D surface of a tooth than a 2D x-ray image is able to show. Examples include specific locations and sizes of cavities, cracked teeth, excessive erosion, abrasion and many more.

Conventional dental impressions are made by placing an impression material loaded on an impression tray over the dental arches. As it sets a negative imprint of the soft and hard tissues in the mouth. Digital intra-oral impressions made using intra-oral cameras are able to recreate the positive impression of a patient's dentition and other structures into a digital format on a computer almost instantly.

Enhancements

Colour matching 
Traditionally dentists will use a physical shade guide in the dental surgery as they compare the patient's teeth to the shades in the guide, all done while the patient is in the chair. Newer computer matching techniques allow for a more superior than matching methods currently used. There is always differences in perception when it comes to the human eye and observation. This was proved in a study which found that there was a high statistical correlation between a spectrophotometer and the digital camera used. Now used in some dental surgeries it can improve dental-laboratory communication.

CAD/CAM in dentistry

CAD/CAM used with intra-oral scanning 
Two studies investigated the accuracy of both direct an indirect digitized impressions used to make clinically acceptable zirconia crowns. It was shown that a significantly smaller marginal fit was observed when compared to traditional methods of casting, a more accurate marginal and internal fit. The efficiency and fit of fully ceramic restorations fabricated through CAD/CAM were evaluated through a double-blinded randomized clinical trial. Direct digitized impressions were taken straight from the patients mouths and indirect digitized impression taken from already made impressions. The digitized impressions were then used to create CAD/CAM milled all-ceramic crowns. Between the direct and indirect, the direct digital impression technique was statistically more accurate, they showed significantly better inter-proximal contact. The entire process proved to be more time efficient for both the dentist and patient in comparison with conventional methods or taking impressions with silicone impressions and sending them to a lab.

Use of dental technology in other areas of dentistry 
Within the dental profession there are already uses for digital dentistry and as technology continues to develop, proposed uses for the futures. Some examples are outlined below;

Diagnosis of caries 
Caries disease process results in structural changes to the dental hard tissue. The diffusion of ions out of the tooth, known as the demineralisation process, will result in loss of mineral content. The resulting region will be filled mainly by bacteria and water. This region will have greater porosity than the surrounding tissue, which results in a distinct change in the optical properties of the affected dental tissue, providing evidence of caries-induced change. Optically based methods detect caries on changes in the specific optical properties.

Quantitative light-induced fluorescence
Changes in enamel fluorescence can be detected and measured when the tooth is illuminated by violet-blue light from a camera hand piece. The image is saved and processed. The end product is an image which gives a measure of the extent and severity of the lesion.
Furthermore, DEXIS CariVu is a digital dentistry device that utilizes near-infrared (NIR) transillumination to detect dental caries. This device causes the tooth enamel and structure to appear transparent but porous carious lesions trap and absorb the light appearing dark in the image. This contrasting image field created makes it easy for suspicious regions that may contain early dental caries to be viewed. This image taken can be stored in electronic health records to be referenced later for monitored treatment plans by a dental professional. This non-invasive, inexpensive, and radiation-free treatment is a promising technology for the early detection of dental caries.

Occlusion and TMJ analysis

Digital orthodontics 
Orthodontics along with jaw surgery were the two dental specialty field that adopted CAD/CAM digital technology. Clear aligner treatment specifically the Invisalign appliance was one of the early orthodontic appliances adapting digital design and 3D printing technology in orthodontics. Custom robotic bend wires entered the market around the same time yet failed to penetrate the market as much as aligners. Digital orthodontics, a practice of integrating digital imaging and 3D printing in daily practice of orthodontics is expanding in the field of orthodontics.

Virtual and augmented reality 
Virtual reality (VR) is a computer-generated simulation which allows for interactive experience, it fully recreates the environment for which the simulation that is ran. Augmented reality (AR) may be considered a form of virtual reality and is a way of interacting with the real world through a simulation. The objects and individuals are augmented due to them being computer-generated, but are perceived in the real world through a camera onto a screen.

Simulations produced by augmented reality can take on the reason for training activities by using technologically synthesised features which are able to mimic real life situations. These can be used throughout the career timeline of a profession, from undergraduate students, specialised and training days. VR and AR systems are becoming more common in dental education. They will continue to change clinical training and encourage more receptive ways of processing individual learning needs and self-directed learning. Pedagogical tools such as these are said to lower the costs of the educational process while increasing the quality.

Limitations
Limitations on digital dentistry include cost, lack of desire to adapt to new dental technology, and misunderstanding of new technologies.

The future 
As digital dentistry continues to adapt and becomes more common, the approach to incorporating the topic of digital dentistry in learning outcomes during dental training must also change. As we enter 'the digital age of dental education', future practitioners need to be exposed to new digital procedures in the curriculum and teaching. In an article titled "Digital Teaching and Digital Medicine: A national initiative is needed", it is suggested that faculties and ministries should be the ones to encourage integration of digital teaching into the education of future physicians and students and the learning of digital technologies which are up to date and relevant.

References 

Dental equipment